The Circumferential Road 5–Ortigas Avenue Interchange, also known as the C-5–Ortigas Interchange, is a pair of intersecting flyovers in Pasig, Metro Manila, the Philippines that serves as the junction between Circumferential Road 5 (C-5) and Ortigas Avenue. Originally a regular four-way intersection, the current interchange was inaugurated in 2003, and completed in 2004.

History and technical specifications
Another two-lane,  flyover along Ortigas Avenue was also supposed to be constructed as part of the project, but was ultimately excluded from the project by the Department of Public Works and Highways.

Construction of the interchange began in January 2001 led by the Sumitomo Corporation, with the work being contracted out to F.F. Cruz and Company, one of the Philippines' largest construction companies.  The interchange was finally completed in March 2004, although it was inaugurated on December 23, 2003, by Bayani Fernando, then serving as Chairman of the Metropolitan Manila Development Authority.

Cost overruns
Construction of the C-5–Ortigas Interchange was marred by cost overruns and accusations of overpricing by the contractor, Sumitomo. Ultimately, the interchange project that the C-5–Ortigas Interchange was a part of was ₱1 billion over budget.

See also
Circumferential Road 5
Ortigas Avenue
EDSA–Ortigas Interchange

References

Road interchanges in the Philippines
Japan International Cooperation Agency